The Bir el-Bey train collision occurred on 24 September 2010, at Bir el-Bey, Tunisia, when two trains collided with each other. One person reportedly died as a result of the accident, and 57 people were reported injured.

Accident 
A train coming from Tunisia's Sfax derailed and toppled over after being hit by the other train at the tail wagon at 3 p.m. local time (14:00 UTC) at Bir el-Bey train station.

Cause 
The collision was caused by poor visibility, the result of a violent rainstorm.

References 

2010 in Tunisia
Railway accidents in 2010
Train collisions in Tunisia
2010 disasters in Tunisia